Vandeveer is a surname. Notable people with the surname include:

Ferdinand Vandeveer Hayden (1829–1887), American geologist
Logan Vandeveer (died 1855), Texas Ranger
Michael Vandeveer, American politician
Ray Vandeveer (born 1953), American politician

See also
Van der Veer